Keith Stuart Brian Reid (born 19 October 1946) is an English lyricist and songwriter who wrote the lyrics of every song released by Procol Harum that was not previously recorded by someone else, with the exception of the songs on their 2017 album Novum.

Biography
Reid grew up in London and is Jewish, the son of a Holocaust survivor. He left school at an early age to pursue a songwriting career. He met Gary Brooker, lead singer with Procol Harum, with whom he co-wrote most of the band's songs (some music was written by organist Matthew Fisher and by guitarist Robin Trower), in 1966. They began collaborating, and their composition "A Whiter Shade of Pale", Procol Harum's first single, was released in 1967. It reached the top of the UK Singles Chart and sold over six million copies worldwide. Keith Reid was an official member of Procol Harum and attended all their recording sessions and most of their concert performances, despite having no performance role in the band. Reid continued to write lyrics for the band until they disbanded in 1977.  Reid has said that the dark tone of his lyric writing derives from his familial experience of the Holocaust.

He also wrote the lyrics for two songs by the French singer Michel Polnareff in 1966 ("You'll Be On My Mind" and "Time Will Tell"), and was co-writer for the John Farnham hit "You're the Voice" (1986).

Reid moved to New York and founded a management company in 1986. He reunited with Brooker and Procol Harum for the albums The Prodigal Stranger (1991) and The Well's on Fire (2003).

In August 2008, a new album, The Common Thread, was issued under The Keith Reid Project banner. Reid wrote the lyrics for the songs, which were performed by a variety of musicians, including Southside Johnny, Chris Thompson, John Waite and Michael Saxell. The album was produced by Keith Reid and Matt Noble.

A new album from the Keith Reid Project, In My Head, was released in December 2018.

References

External links
Procol Harum.com biography of Keith Reid
Procol Harum words by Keith Reid
Seth Rogovoy, The Secret Jewish History Of Procol Harum

1946 births
Living people
People from Welwyn Garden City
Procol Harum members
English lyricists
English Jews
English songwriters
Musicians from Hertfordshire
Jewish British musicians